Aq Qasemlu (also Romanized as Āq Qāsemlū; also known as Āq Qāselmū, Qareh Qāsemlū, and Qāsemlū) is a village in Arshaq-e Shomali Rural District, Arshaq District, Meshgin Shahr County, Ardabil Province, Iran. At the 2006 census, its population was 330, in 76 families.

References 

Tageo

Towns and villages in Meshgin Shahr County